Nephelaphyllum aureum, the leaf litter orchid, is an orchid endemic to Mount Kinabalu, Borneo, Malaysia.

Distribution 
Endemic to Borneo.

References

External links 

aureum
Orchids of Borneo
Endemic orchids of Malaysia
Plants described in 1994
Flora of Mount Kinabalu